The Walker Adams House is a historic building located on the eastside of Davenport, Iowa. It was listed on the National Register of Historic Places in 1984.

History
Walker Adams was a partner in a cooperage before he became a wholesaler of shingles and staves. Adams and his family lived on this property since 1868. This is probably the second house located here as the exterior features suggest a later date. After Walker's death, his wife Mary continued to live in the house into the 1890s.

Architecture
There are a number of Italianate houses such as this one in the Fulton Addition to the city of Davenport. Its vertical proportions and the millwork decoration on the eaves represents the post-Civil War expression of the style. The two-story brick house features a hipped roof, a three-bay front and an entrance that is left of center. The veranda on the south side has subsequently been enclosed. The porches have fluted posts with entablature. A bracketed cornice is just below the roofline. It also features a single molding strip at the base of the frieze that was a popular detail in mid-19th century Davenport.

References

Houses completed in 1875
Italianate architecture in Iowa
Houses in Davenport, Iowa
Houses on the National Register of Historic Places in Iowa
National Register of Historic Places in Davenport, Iowa